Kim Woo-sung (born April 2, 1986) is an alpine skier from South Korea.  He has competed for South Korea at the 2006 Olympics and the 2010 Olympics.

References

External links
 

1986 births
Living people
South Korean male alpine skiers
Olympic alpine skiers of South Korea
Alpine skiers at the 2006 Winter Olympics
Alpine skiers at the 2010 Winter Olympics
Asian Games medalists in alpine skiing
Alpine skiers at the 2007 Asian Winter Games
Alpine skiers at the 2011 Asian Winter Games
Asian Games bronze medalists for South Korea
Medalists at the 2007 Asian Winter Games
Medalists at the 2011 Asian Winter Games
21st-century South Korean people